Shkemb Miftari (born August 1, 1993) is a German footballer of Albanian descent who plays for SV Fellbach.

References

External links

Shkemb Miftari at FuPa

1993 births
Living people
German footballers
German people of Albanian descent
VfL Wolfsburg II players
Stuttgarter Kickers II players
Stuttgarter Kickers players
SV Waldhof Mannheim players
SSV Reutlingen 05 players
FC Schalke 04 II players
3. Liga players
Regionalliga players
Association football forwards
People from Freyung-Grafenau
Sportspeople from Lower Bavaria
Footballers from Bavaria